Scott McCready (born February 1, 1977) is a British former wide receiver in American football.  Previously he played for the Scottish Claymores from 2002–2004, and was named to the All-League team on multiple occasions.

McCready was the first British national to win the Super Bowl, which he did as a member of the New England Patriots practice squad in 2001. His team won Super Bowl XXXVI over the St. Louis Rams. McCready's father was a Royal Air Force pilot; after football, McCready became a pilot for Etihad Airways.

References

1977 births
Living people
Hamburg Sea Devils players
Scottish Claymores players
South Florida Bulls football players
English players of American football
New England Patriots players
Carolina Panthers players
Kansas City Chiefs players
American aviators